Tanka is a form of Japanese poetry.

Tanka may also refer to:
 Tanka people, an ethnic group in China
 Tanka (Peru), a mountain in Peru
 Tanka (sword) or habaki, part of a Japanese bladed weapon
 Thangka or Tanka, a Tibetan silk painting with embroidery
 Tanka (coin), a silver coin used in South Asia

See also

 Tanka movement, a militant agrarian struggle on behalf of the Hajong tribal people in East Bengal 1942-1950
 Bangladeshi taka, a currency named after the silver coin
 Tanca (disambiguation)
 Tonka (disambiguation)
 Taanka, a type of underground cistern